Amblytropis is a genus of moss in family Pilotrichaceae.

Etymology 
The genus name is from the Greek amblys "blunt", "obtuse" and tropis "ship, keel", referring to the petals.

Species

The genus Amblytropis contains the following species:
 Amblytropis gemmacea (Mitt.) Broth.
 Amblytropis hispidula (Mitt.) Broth.
 Amblytropis ovata (Mitt.) Broth.
 Amblytropis setosa (Mitt.) Broth.

References 

Moss genera
Hookeriales